Cruziturricula is a genus of sea snails, marine gastropod mollusks in the family Drilliidae.

Species
Species within the genus Cruziturricula include:
 Cruziturricula arcuata (Reeve, 1843)
Species brought into synonymy
 Cruziturricula panthea (Dall, 1919): synonym of Cruziturricula arcuata (Reeve, 1843)

References

External links
 Olsson, Axel A. "Biological Results of the University of Miami Deep-Sea Expeditions. 77. Mollusks from the Gulf of Panama Collected by R/V John Elliott Pillsbury, 1967." Bulletin of Marine Science 21.1 (1971): 35-92
 WMSDB - Worldwide Mollusc Species Data Base: family Drilliidae